Robert Chinn is a New Zealand-born American international chef, television presenter, restaurateur and cookbook author. He is a culinary celebrity across Asia and the Middle East, thanks to his role as host of Discovery TLC's World Cafe, and as a judge on MBC's Top Chef Middle East. He opened two award-winning restaurants in Vietnam – Restaurant Bobby Chinn in Hanoi (2001) and Bobby Chinn Saigon in Ho Chi Minh (2011), then relocated to London in 2014 and opened the House of Ho Vietnamese restaurant.

Early life and education
Bobby Chinn was born in Auckland, New Zealand to an Egyptian mother and a Chinese father. His culinary story began at the age of 10, as he began to explore Asian and North African recipes in his grandmothers' kitchens.

Chinn was a graduate of the Urban School of San Francisco. His early education was in Cairo, Egypt at St George's College, Heliopolis  and then in London, England, where he attended Millfield, Somerset UK from 1977 to 1980 on a sports scholarship. He attended the College of Marin, the University of Nevada, Las Vegas, Saint Mary's College in Moraga, California and Richmond College in London, where he graduated with a BA in Finance and Economics (1986). In 2020 he was awarded an honorary Doctorate in Liberal Arts from Richmond College.

After graduating, Chinn worked as a research analyst in Boca Raton, Florida, then a hedge fund in San Francisco, before moving to New York City where he worked on the floor of the New York Stock Exchange.

In 1990, he worked for Blue Shell, supplying Prince Edward Island mussels and oysters to the top restaurants in New York City. Chinn enrolled in the French Culinary Institute in New York, but dropped out in order to study improvisational comedy at The Groundlings, Los Angeles. He then returned to San Francisco to pursue stand-up comedy, performing at the Holy City Zoo.

He can speak English and Egyptian Arabic.

Chef Bobby Chinn

Chinn's culinary career began at the Elka Restaurant in the Miyako Hotel in San Francisco, working under notable chefs Elka Gilmore and Traci Des Jardins. His big break came from Hubert Keller of Fleur de Lys, where he worked the pantry for a year. He was part of the opening team at the Coconut Grove on Van Ness Avenue, where he became the saucier, but succumbed to a back injury. He work-staged in France, then returned to San Francisco for back surgery.

In 1996, Chinn moved to Ho Chi Minh City and worked at La Camargue restaurant. Within six months, he had opened his own restaurant, Saigon Joe's, and moved to Hanoi to open another restaurant, Miro. In 1997, he opened the Red Onion, overlooking the infamous "Hanoi Hilton". The success of the restaurant gave him the opportunity to open his eponymous restaurant in 2001, Restaurant Bobby Chinn.

In 2014, Chinn moved to London and launched a modern Vietnamese concept at The House of Ho, which occupies the former site of The 2i's Coffee Bar, Soho. This has now been sold to a group of private investors.

Ambassador roles
 In 2012, he was appointed WWF Ambassador for Sustainable Seafood. As WWF's Sustainable Seafood Ambassador for the Coral Triangle, he helped WWF raise awareness on the importance of responsible seafood consumption, particularly in the Coral Triangle region, to help alleviate pressures on coastal and marine environments and dwindling fish populations.
 In 2014, he was appointed Tourism Ambassador for Vietnam in Europe.
 In 2021, he was appointed Goodwill Ambassador for The Naomi Tami Memorial Fund

Television
Chinn's television career was launched with his first solo TV show, World Café Asia, on TLC – also known as Planet Food on the Discovery Channel – presenting a taste of Asia through traditional street stalls, hawker centres, acclaimed restaurants and hot spots. He was awarded 'Best Entertainment Presenter' at the Asia TV Awards for the series in 2007. The second season, World Café Middle East, had equal success, and he was awarded 'Best Entertainment Programme' by the Asia TV Awards 2010. The show was re-cut and sold to Globe Trekker. He hosted Globe Trekker Food Hour: Ireland in 2014, and Globe Trekker Food Hour: Sicily in 2015. Following the success of his first show, Chinn hosted a second show with Discovery Network, called Bobby Chinn Cooks Asia, a travel cookery series which highlights Asian recipes laced with local history and culture.

Chinn is currently a judge on MBC's Top Chef Middle East.

He has worked with some of the leading TV food personalities including Keith Floyd, Martha Stewart, Anthony Bourdain, Antony Worrall Thompson and Andrew Zimmern.

Chinn had a supporting part as a 'bunk mate' in ’The Beautiful Country’ (2004) featuring Nick Nolte and Bai Ling, filmed in Vietnam as well as ‘Death Dreams (1991) starring Christopher Reeve. 

Chinn appeared in “Can Chefs Save The World?” a three part documentary series by UTOPICFOOD! Created by Mason Florence and John Krich, the production investigates the roles and perceptions of some of the greatest chefs in the world, featuring the likes of Massimo Bottura and José Andrés through intimate, up close and personal interviews.

In 2020 Chinn filmed 6 episodes of 'Keep It Simple' which launched across the Middle East on MBC's Shahid Originals streaming service

Media
Chinn was a guest on A&T Media's Podcast episode 'What I did Next' (2021)

Personal life
Chinn is the grandson of former Egyptian military commander Saad El Shazly.

Cookbook
 Wild Wild East: Recipes & Stories from Vietnam, 2007 (reprinted as Vietnamese Food in 2014). Shortlisted for best Asian cookbook in the World Gourmand Food Awards. It is both an authentic guide to Vietnamese food with recipes for modern adaptations of traditional dishes and a roller-coaster journey of Chinn's adventures in Vietnam. In the foreword, Anthony Bourdain claims that "what Bobby doesn’t know about Southeast Asian food is not worth knowing".

References

External links

1964 births
Living people
New Zealand people of Chinese descent
New Zealand people of Egyptian descent
New Zealand television chefs